Tidar (also Romanized as Tīdar) is a village in Gowharan Rural District, Gowharan District, Bashagard County, Hormozgan Province, Iran. At the 2006 census, its population was 306, in 65 families.

References 

Populated places in Bashagard County